Live at the Black Cat is a live album by American hardcore punk band Scream. It was released on February 10, 1998 by Torque Records. The album was recorded live at The Black Cat in Washington D.C. on December 28, 1996, at a Christmas reunion show. The band featured the original band line-up of Franz Stahl on lead guitar, his brother Pete Stahl on lead vocals, Skeeter Thompson on bass and Kent Stax on drums. Robert "Harley" Davidson, who was picked up by the band in the mid 1980's during the recording of the band's second album "This Side Up" also performed on guitar on the recording.  All material on the record was written by Franz and Pete Stahl with the exception of "No More Censorship" which was written by Davidson. Scream alumni drummer Dave Grohl who played with Nirvana and later Foo Fighters guest appeared as the drummer on "No More Censorship".

Track listing
"Came Without Warning" – 2:15
"Cry Wolf" – 1:04
"This Side Up" – 2:37
"New Song" – 2:25
"Solidarity" – 1:42
"Total Mash" – 2:00
"Show & Tell Me" – 2:03
"Ultra Violence" – 1:38
"Still Screaming" – 2:35
"No More Censorship" – 4:27
"Fight/American Justice" – 3:52
"Zoo Closes" – 1:52
"Bet You Never Thought" – 2:59
"Hygiene" – 2:51
"Bedlam" – 1:52
"Influenced to Ignorance" – 1:12
"U Sucka" – 1:24
"We're Fed Up" – 1:34
"Human Behavior" – 1:50
"Feel Like That" – 5:52

Personnel
Scream
Pete Stahl – vocals
Franz Stahl – guitar
Skeeter Thompson – bass
Robert "Harley" Davidson – guitar
Kent Stax – drums, except on "No More Censorship"
Dave Grohl – drums on "No More Censorship"

References

Scream (band) albums
1998 live albums